Ulsan Science Museum is a science museum located in Ok-dong, Nam-gu, Ulsan, South Korea. Established in 2011, the museum has an area of  spread out over 6 floors. There is space for several exhibitions, a planetarium, and science labs and classrooms for educational courses. The exhibitions are almost entirely in Korean, but there are also English programs available for visiting schools.

See also 

 List of museums in South Korea
 List of South Korean tourist attractions
 Jangsaengpo Whale Museum
 Ulsan Museum

References

External links 
 Official website 

Science museums in South Korea
Nam District, Ulsan
Museums in Ulsan